Artur Ziętek (12 October 1978 – 10 April 2010) was a Polish pilot.

He died in the 2010 Polish Air Force Tu-154 crash near Smolensk on 10 April 2010. He was posthumously awarded the Order of Polonia Restituta.

References

1978 births
2010 deaths
Polish Air Force officers
Knights of the Order of Polonia Restituta
Victims of the Smolensk air disaster